JCSAT-4A, designated JCSAT-6 before launch, is a Japanese geostationary communications satellite which is operated by JSAT Corporation (now SKY Perfect JSAT Group). It is positioned in geostationary orbit at a longitude of 124° East, from where it is used to provide broadcasting and corporate network communications to Japan.

Spacecraft description 
JCSAT-6 was constructed by Hughes, based on the HS-601 satellite bus.

Launch 
It was launched atop an Atlas IIAS launch vehicle flying from Launch Complex 36A at the Cape Canaveral Air Force Station. The launch occurred at 01:45:26 UTC on 16 February 1999, and successfully placed JCSAT-6 into a geostationary transfer orbit. From this orbit, the satellite raised itself into a geostationary orbit using an R-4D apogee motor. The final burn to complete its insertion into geosynchronous orbit occurred on 1 March 1999.

See also 

 1999 in spaceflight

References 

Spacecraft launched in 1999
Satellites using the BSS-601 bus
Communications satellites of Japan
Satellites of Japan